Laotian Americans are Americans who trace their ancestry to Laos. Laotian Americans are included in the larger category of Asian Americans.  The major immigrant generation were generally refugees who escaped Laos during the warfare and disruption of the 1970s, and entered refugee camps in Thailand across the Mekong River. They emigrated to the United States during the late 1970s and throughout the 1980s.

The category of 'Laotian American', includes all ethnic groups who lived within the borders of Laos, and does not include Hmong community.

History
Laotian immigration to the United States started shortly after the Vietnam War. Refugees began arriving in the U.S. after a Communist government came to power in Laos in 1975 and by 1980, the Laotian population of the U.S. reached 47,683, according to census estimates. The numbers increased dramatically during the 1980s so the census estimated that there were 147,375 people by 1990.  The group continued to grow, somewhat more slowly, to 167,792 by 2000. By 2008, the population nearly reached 240,532. Included are the Hmong, a mountainous tribe from that country.

Demographics
The states with the largest Laotian American populations (including the Hmong from Laos) are California (58,424, 0.2%), Texas (13,298, 0.1%), Minnesota (10,065, 0.2%), Washington (9,333, 0.2%), Colorado (7,434, 0.1%), Tennessee (6,336, 0.1%), Illinois (5,822, 0.1%), North Carolina (5,566, 0.1%), Georgia (5,560, 0.1%), Florida (4,896, 0.05%), and Oregon (4,692, 0.1%). There are about over 200,000 ethnic Lao in America. Approximately 8,000 to 11,000 Americans are of mixed Lao and other descent. Ethnic Lao people may identify as both Lao American and Laotian American (see also Hmong American).

Most were estimated to live in the West (95,574), followed by the South (44,471), Midwest (37,820), and Northeast (15,382).

Cities or regions with significant Laotian-American populations include the Seattle metropolitan area (enumerating 12,190; 0.4% of its population); San Francisco Bay Area (11,545; 0.2%); Dallas–Fort Worth metropolitan area (10,500; 0.2%); Sacramento metropolitan area (9,814; 0.4%); Minneapolis – Saint Paul area (8,676; 0.3%); San Diego metropolitan area (8,079; 0.3%); Fresno metropolitan area (7,967; 0.9%); Greater Los Angeles Area (7,120; 0.04%); Nashville metropolitan area (6,210; 0.4%); Portland metropolitan area (5,806; 0.3%); Chicago metropolitan area (4,762; 0.05%); San Joaquin County, California (4,266; 0.6%); Providence, Rhode Island (3,456; 0.2%); Denver metropolitan area (2,673), Des Moines, Iowa (2,270), Anchorage metropolitan area (1,997; 0.5%), and Fort Smith, Arkansas-Arkoma, Oklahoma (1,730).

Smaller Laotian communities can be found in other cities and metropolitan areas across the United States. In the Southern United States, there is a significant Laotian community in St. Petersburg, Florida, where at least 1,000 Laotian-Americans reside. There are communities in Habersham County, Georgia (740), and Houston, Texas.

In the Southwestern and Midwestern United States, there are Laotian communities in Denver, Colorado; Storm Lake, Iowa (400; 4%), and Wichita, Kansas (1,594; 0.4%). The Oaklawn-Sunview community near Wichita is 11.5% Laotian American. In the Chicago area, there are sizable Laotian communities in the suburban cities of Aurora, Elgin, Joliet, and Rockford.

In the San Francisco Bay Area, the Laotian population is concentrated in the cities of Oakland, Richmond/San Pablo, San Jose, and Santa Rosa/Roseland. Elsewhere in Northern California, there are Laotian communities in Chico, Eureka, Redding, Stockton, and Yuba City. In central and southern California, there are communities in Fresno - also one of the largest Hmong communities outside Laos, Merced, and in Tulare County, California, especially in the city of Porterville. In the 1980s after the communist takeover of Laos, over 10,000 Laotians settled in central California. Many of the Laotians settled in central California to work in the farmland there. Additional Laotian communities exist in the Los Angeles Metropolitan area and in the Inland Empire region (i.e. Banning).

In the Northeast, there are Laotian communities spread across the New England states. With the large concentration in Providence, Rhode Island, Woonsocket, Rhode Island, Lowell, Massachusetts, and Newmarket, New Hampshire.

Community and social issues

Poverty
According to data collected by the American government in 2013, 18.5% of all Laotian Americans live under the poverty line.

Per capita income
In 2014, identified by factfinder census, when Americans' per capita income was divided by ethnic groups Laotian Americans were revealed to have a per capita income of only $21,479 below the American average of $25,825.

Lack of education and school dropout rates
According to data collected in 2013, 38% of all Laotian Americans drop out of high school.

Culture

Religion 

66% of the population in Laos adhere to Buddhism and Buddhism is the basis and mainstream religion practiced in Laos. Lao Buddhists belong to Theravada Buddhism and are tolerant towards the pre-Buddhist animist or folk beliefs, which is the belief of spiritual essence possessed in objects and creatures. Buddhists residing in rural parts of Lao also maintained the belief in ancestral spirits, which are the souls and spirits from afterlife. Although Buddhism is the major religion practiced in Laos, there are also Christian minority. There are three Christian churches in Laos: Lao Evangelical Church, the Seventh-day Adventist Church and the Roman Catholic Church.

Theravada Buddhist Temple 

Laotian-American populations have constructed numerous Buddhist temples, called vat or wat. Over time, the congregation donates money to customize and add on to the facility, as well as to add fine artwork and craftsmanship, resulting in a Laotian Buddhist temple that has some traditional features. Examples include Wat Lao Buddhavong located outside Washington, D.C.; Wat Lao Buddharam of San Diego, California; Wat Lao of S. Farmington, Minnesota; Wat Lao Buddhamamakaram of Columbus, Ohio; Wat Lao Mixayaram and Wat Lao Dhammacetiyaram of Seattle, Washington; Wat Lao Buddha Ariyamett Aram Temple in Morris, Connecticut; Wat Lao Lane Xang, founded in 1993 in Willington, Connecticut; Wat Lao Rattanaram in Richmond, California and the Wat Lao Mixayaram in Lowell, Massachusetts. With the growth of Laotian communities in more diverse areas, they have moved to and constructed temples in rural areas, such as Lane Xang Village, located between Lafayette and New Iberia in Louisiana.

Representation in media
One of the first national Laotian-American publication, Lao Roots Magazine, was published in 2007.  The English-language magazine is geared toward the younger generation of the Laotian-American community.  Published in San Diego by a small volunteer staff, the magazine has reached widespread national circulation within the Laotian-American community. After the publication ceased, former staff member and Yale University graduate Siamphone Louankang created the popular online magazine LaoAmericans.com, which continues to share stories by and about Americans of Laotian descent.

The documentary film The Betrayal (Nerakhoon) was directed by Ellen Kuras and Thavisouk Phrasavath.  It portrays the epic of a family forced to emigrate from Laos after the chaos of the secret air war waged by the U.S. during the Vietnam War. Kuras spent 23 years chronicling the family's  journey in this film.  The film won a Spectrum Award for the Full Frame Documentary Film Festival; it was nominated for an Oscar for best documentary.

The Souphanousinphone family, Laotian Americans, are featured on King of the Hill, an animated TV series.

The subject of Jamie Wyeth's painting Kalounna in Frogtown is Laotian American.

Krysada Binly Phounsiri (Lancer) & Kennedy Phounsiri (EraNetik), brothers from San Diego, California who share the same passion for breakdancing, were featured on season 6 of America's Got Talent with a dance team called the Body Poets and are now current performers in the Jabbawockeez - "MÜS.I.C" Show in Las Vegas, Nevada. They are also part of the breakdance crew  "The Calamities", which they created in 2002.

CSI: Crime Scene Investigation (season 6), in episode 2 titled “Room Service” both the murder victim and perpetrator are Laotian American.

Sports
Laotian Americans have excelled in a variety of sports achieving success at the collegiate, national and international level. While many of the individuals discussed in this section may not be notable among the general U.S. population, they are considered pioneers in sport within the Laotian American community and many are believed to be the first to compete at a national level or higher. Many of the second and later generation Laotian American athletes are of mixed heritage.

Khan Malaythong is thought to have become the first Laotian American to represent the U.S. at the Olympic games when he qualified for the U.S. badminton team as a doubles competitor at the 2008 Summer Olympics.

Phoothaphone “Ko” Chandetka is a nationally recognized competitive body builder of Laotian descent who has competed on and off for over twenty years. He is believed to be the first Laotian American to achieve notoriety in the sport.  Ko won his first NPC title in 1991 at the age of nineteen and competed at the national level as recently as 2016 when he placed 7th in the Mr. Olympia contest.

Examples of Laotian American football players competing at the NCAA Division I level include Scott Phaydavong (Drake University), Ramaud Chiaokiao-Bowman (Northwestern), Taisun Phommachanh (Clemson), Malachi Moore, Tyler Phommachanh (University of Connecticut), and Nous Keobounnam (Oregon State). Scott Phaydavong may have been the first Laotian America to play football professionally when in 2009 he joined the German Football League’s Schwabisch Hall Unicorns. Ramaud Chiaokiao-Bowman signed with the Indianapolis Colts as an undrafted free agent in 2021 although he did not obtain a roster spot.  

Angelina Messina, a competitive swimmer from Illinois who is of mixed Laotian and Italian heritage, competed in the 2020 United States Olympic Trials at the age of sixteen.  She is committed to swim at the University of Pittsburgh in 2022 and expected to make a repeat appearance at the 2024 trials. She is the first known Laotian American swimmer to qualify for the U.S. Olympic Swimming Trials.

Notable people

This is a list of notable Laotian Americans, including both original immigrants who obtained American citizenship and their American descendants.

This list does not include Hmong Americans, who can be found in the List of Hmong Americans.

To be included in this list, the person must have a Wikipedia article showing they are Laotian American or must have references showing they are Laotian American and are notable.

Samad Bounthong, soccer player
Ko Chandetka, professional bodybuilder, co-author of the book I am Phoothaphone and subject of the 2019 documentary film Fallen Star Rising Sun.
Chloe Dao, winner of the second season of the reality show Project Runway
John Douangdara, Petty Officer, 1st Class (PO1), lead dog handler for the elite SEAL Team Six; may be the first Laotian American to die as a SEAL Team Six member
TC Huo, writer
Jujubee, drag queen and reality television personality
Channapha Khamvongsa, Executive Director and founder of Legacies of War
Malichansouk Kouanchao, visual artist
Tina Maharath, Ohio State Senator
Khan Malaythong, badminton player at the 2008 Summer Olympics
Malachi Moore, football player
Justin Phongsavanh, F54 Paralympic Javelin bronze medalist at the 2020 Paralympic Games
Krysada Panusith Phounsiri, poet, engineer and break-dancer
Thavisouk Phrasavath, Oscar-nominated, Emmy-winning director
Chanida Phaengdara Potter, writer, community activist
Nor Sanavongsay, artist, app developer
Walter Sarnoi Oupathana, professional boxer
Konerak Sinthasomphone, 14-year-old victim of Jeffrey Dahmer
Andre Soukhamthath, mixed martial artist in the Ultimate Fighting Championship
Catzie Vilayphonh, spoken word poet of the group Yellow Rage who were featured on the first season of Def Poetry Jam
Kulap Vilaysack, actress, comedian, and podcaster
Saymoukda Vongsay, writer
Bryan Thao Worra, writer

In fiction
Souphanousinphone family of animated series King of the Hill

See also

Laos Memorial
 Indochina refugee crisis
Laos–United States relations

References

Asian-American society
Southeast Asian American
American people of Laotian descent
Laotian American
Laotian diaspora